Rhopalostyla virgata is a species of beetle in the family Carabidae, the only species in the genus Rhopalostyla.

References

Lebiinae